Arthur Chukwuezugo Okonkwo (born 9 September 2001) is an English professional football player who plays as a goalkeeper for Austrian Bundesliga club Sturm Graz, on loan from Premier League club Arsenal.

Early life 
Born in London, Okonkwo began his career at Hampstead Academy before moving on to Lindus Park, where he joined the Arsenal academy as an eight-year-old in 2009.

Club career

Arsenal
Okonkwo came through the Arsenal ranks quickly, starring on the bench for an under-18 Arsenal match, while being registered as a player for the under-15 team. He also debuted for the under-23 Arsenal side as a 17-year-old. By the 2018-19 season, Okonkwo came runners-up in the U18 Premier League, and was already appearing as a bench goalkeeper for the first team, and going into the 2019-20 campaign, he would be 3rd in line for goalkeeping duties. Okonkwo struggled with injury in the 2019-20 campaign, failing to register a single appearance for any of the Arsenal teams. Okonkwo's double save in the Premier League 2, against Brighton was a contender for the best save of the 2020-21 season.

Okonkwo played in Arsenal under-21s' 2–1 victory in the EFL Trophy at Crawley Town on 30 October 2020, and in a 1–1 draw at Plymouth Argyle in the same competition on 2 November 2021.

He signed a senior contract with Arsenal in early July 2021, donning the number 33 for the first team. Okonkwo made his senior team debut on 13 July 2021, against Hibernian in a friendly, misjudging a back pass from Arsenal teammate Cedric Soares, to grant Martin Boyle a tap-in, in a 2–1 loss to Hibernian.

Crewe Alexandra (loan)
Okonkwo joined EFL League Two side Crewe Alexandra on a season-long loan on 29 July 2022. He was signed in time to be eligible for Crewe's season-opening game at Rochdale; Crewe's first-choice goalkeeper, Dave Richards, had suffered a finger injury and required an operation. Okonkwo duly made his Crewe and professional league debut in a 2–1 win at Spotland on 30 July 2022, then kept a clean sheet on his home debut in a 3–0 win over Harrogate Town at Gresty Road on 6 August 2022. After 26 appearances and ten clean sheets for Crewe, Okonkwo was recalled by Arsenal in mid-January 2023.

Sturm Graz (loan)
On 16 January 2023, Okonkwo joined Austrian Bundesliga side Sturm Graz on loan until the end of the season.

International career 
Okonkwo represented England at under-16 and under-17 levels, then debuted for the under-18s two days before his birthday. He remains eligible for Nigeria, too, through his family descent.

Style of play 
An Arsenal academy graduate, Okonkwo has stated that Petr Cech and David De Gea influence his own goalkeeping style. Okonkwo said this on him playing as a goalkeeper: "I tried playing outfield but it wasn’t for me. I enjoyed the thrill of making saves – the more spectacular the better".

Career statistics

References 

2001 births
Footballers from Greater London
Black British sportspeople
English sportspeople of Nigerian descent
Living people
English footballers
Association football goalkeepers
England youth international footballers
Arsenal F.C. players
Crewe Alexandra F.C. players
SK Sturm Graz players
English Football League players
English expatriate footballers
Expatriate footballers in Austria
English expatriate sportspeople in Austria